Kevork Shadoyan (Arabic: كيفورك شادويان; born 14 February 1974) is a Syrian/Armenian fashion designer. His main workshop is in Yerevan, Armenia.

Early life 
Shadoyan was born in 1974 in Aleppo, Syria to an Armenian family. Kevork's father was a tailor in Aleppo and the young man fell in love with working with clothing in his teenage years. He had his own designer school in Aleppo. Kevork was very well known in the area and was even once invited to Saudi Arabia to design the dowry clothes for one of the princesses there. For four months, together with forty Indian workers, he designed and made almost forty dresses for her. After schooling and practice he decided to bring his workmanship to the homeland and settled down in Armenia. Kevork always wanted to come to Armenia to learn the history and create traditional Armenian clothes. He finally moved in 2001, and he studied at the National Academy of Arts and has been living in Armenia since.

Education 
Shadoyan was educated in the Armenian schools of Aleppo including Karen Jeppe Gemaran School and others. In 1997 he graduated from the "College Artistique de la Mode Moderne" institute in Lebanon as a designer and tailor. Then he worked with famous Lebanese fashion designers.

In 2004 he graduated from the "Yerevan State Academy of Fine Arts " with an honor Degree to get qualified in Decorative Design of Textile Manufacture, where he was specialized in the history of the Armenian costumes and ornaments.

Career 
He has begun his fashion shows in Lebanon, Syria and then Armenia "Fashion week". 
 In 2004 he exhibited his first collection"The Modern Armenian Wedding" in USA (Boston, LA, Houston). 
 In 2005 he exhibited his second collection"The Golden Autumn" in USA (LA, Houston). 
 In 2006 he exhibited his collection "The Armenian Traditional Garments Today" in Sydney-Australia.
 Besides his many individual fashion shows in Armenia in 2006, he participated in the Prêt à Porter Yerevan, then in a contest in Hong Kong. 
 In 2006 he was offered a professional title in Moscow for participating in the "Fashion Assembly".
 In 2007 he prepared the final dance costumes for the "Navasart Ensemble" in Paris, and he exhibited his works during the festival there. 
 In 2007 he exhibited his paintings and his latest collection "The Armenian Silk Road" in Sydney-Australia.
 In 2008, he showed the newest collection; Autumn/Winter 2008–2009 in Lviv Fashion Week, Ukraine.
 In 2014 Shadoyan's spring / summer 2015 runway show was unveiled on one of the many catwalks of Belarus Fashion Week (BFW).
 Oriflame Fashion Night 2015 night was organized in the heart of Yerevan, at Swan Lake showing new collections by well-known designers in Armenia. Oriflame has inspired the best stylists for the creation of the hair-dos and make-up of models.
 In 2015 Estet Fashion Week “Renaissance” collection of national costumes, which received the Best Foreign Collection Award at Estet Fashion Week in Moscow.

Reincarnation 
The latest collection of the Shadoyan Couture House is called “Reincarnation” and is dedicated to the Armenian Genocide Centennial. The collection only includes Armenian national costumes. The designer revived the traditional costumes by synthesizing his imagination with the standards of the fabrics, colors and ornaments of traditional costumes and got a beautiful mix of the old and the new.

On July 9, 2015, internationally recognized Syrian-Armenian fashion designer Kevork Shadoyan presented his Renaissance collection of late 18th century and early 19th century Armenian national costumes devoted to the Centennial of the Armenian Genocide at Ararat Armenian Sport and Cultural Union of New Julfa, reports Yeranush Tahmazian to Hayern Aysor from Isfahan.

The collection includes samples of the national costumes of 26 women, 8 men and 15 children of Mush, Taron, Trabizon, Syunik, Kharberd, Cilicia, Artsakh, Zeytun, Karin, Vaspurakan, Bagheshi and the Govtun village of Sebastia and an Armenian woman of Tehran that were showcased by the children and youth of Tehran and New Julfa to the sounds of Armenian songs and music.

The showing of this unique collection ended with the showing of a dress made with the image of the Forget-me-not flower, which is the symbol of the Centennial of the Armenian Genocide, and shown to the sounds of the song “Dle Yaman”. “Kevork Shadoyan has toured different regions of Armenia, has visited museums and has examined print sources to create this collection. With his brilliant imagination and by combining the old and new elements of traditional garments (type of cloth, trimmings and colors), he has created garments that have helped him present the renaissance of traditional Armenian national costumes,” host Mania Ghukasian said in her opening remarks at the event.

At the end, fashion designer Kevork Shadoyan expressed his gratitude to the organizers, the models, the children's parents, the performers and especially Iranian-Armenian Artur Asatrian (for obtaining the materials) and all the supporters. He talked about how he had spread the word about the Renaissance collection, starting from Artsakh and moving to Russia, Armenia and Iran and added that he would continue to showcase the collection in Australia, France, the US and other countries.

After the fashion show, the visitors participated in an exhibition showcasing photos of the national costumes at the hall next to the auditorium.

Awards 
Kevork Shadoyan won the Best Foreign Collection Award during Estet Fashion Week in Moscow, Russia.

References

People from Aleppo
Syrian people of Armenian descent
Armenian fashion designers
1974 births
Living people